is a Japanese illustrator. His notable works include The Ryuo's Work Is Never Done! (2015–present), Myriad Colors Phantom World (2013–2016) and 86 (2017–present). In Kono Light Novel ga Sugoi!, Shirabii ranked 8th in 2017 and 2018, and ranked 1st in 2019 and 2020.

Notes

References

External links 
  
 
 
 
 

Japanese illustrators
Living people
Year of birth missing (living people)